London Knights was an English ice hockey team based in London. They played in the UK's Ice Hockey Superleague between September 1998 and April 2003.

History 
The Knights were founded in 1998 by Anschutz Entertainment Group in the hope of being able to partake in the British ice hockey boom of the 1990s, when teams like Manchester Storm and Sheffield Steelers drew in large crowds of up to 8000 on average and up to 17,000 in single games. Anschutz hoped that a London-based team would help raise the awareness of the sport not only in London, but in the whole of the UK. Furthermore, the team was founded in order to help make the financially struggling London Arena (which was co-owned by Anschutz and SMG) more profitable.

The team shared its name with the Ontario Hockey League team, the London Knights, but they had nothing to do with each other as the origin of the name came from the then policy of Anschutz Entertainment Group to brand its ice hockey franchises with a regal theme associated with its flagship Los Angeles Kings NHL franchise, hence the Ontario Reign, Reading Royals and the Manchester Monarchs and Munich Barons, both of whom are now defunct as well.

The Knights enjoyed some success in their brief existence. They won the British Super League playoffs in 2000, thus becoming British league champion, but their biggest success was reaching the final of the Continental Cup in 2001, becoming the first British team to do so and being the most successful British team in the history of the tournament until it was won by the Nottingham Panthers in 2017. They beat HC Slovan Bratislava 5:2 and the Munich Barons 4:1, but lost to the ZSC Lions 0:1.

They were coached by Jim Fuyarchuk, Chris McSorley, Bob Leslie and Jim Brithén. McSorley would later go on to coach Great Britain and work as assistant coach to Team Canada. His brother Marty McSorley, then of the Boston Bruins, was almost signed by the Knights while serving a 100-game ban in the NHL.

Despite their on-ice success, their attendance figures were always rather disappointing as they never drew much more than 3000 people on average - which certainly wasn't bad considering that before the Knights, there hadn't been a professional ice hockey team in London for decades, but on the other hand, there was certainly much more potential, considering the size of the town, the attendance figures of the other teams in the league and the fact that the arena could hold up to 12,500 people and Anschutz invested much in marketing.

In 2003, the team's arena, the London Arena, was sold, and the team were left homeless. There were hopes they would find a temporary home for two years before moving to the O2 Arena in 2005, but when the Superleague folded after the 2002–03 season, the team announced that it would "not be icing" in the following season, and never returned.

After the demise of the Superleague, the Elite Ice Hockey League was founded as its replacement, and the London Racers were established as a successor to the Knights, but they were much more low-profile and played at a much smaller venue, and after only two and a half seasons, they folded in late 2005 due to safety problems at their home venue. Since then, there hasn't been a London-based ice hockey team in the top-tier league again.

Season history

Superleague
This table shows the Knights' standings and results in the British Ice Hockey Superleague.

The team finished bottom of the league in their first season, but followed that in the 1999-2000 season by winning the playoffs, beating the Newcastle Jesters 7–3 in the final.

Continental Cup 

The Knights became the first British team to reach the finals of the Continental Cup in January 2001, where they narrowly missed taking the title at their first attempt. Their run included a surprise 4-1 win over Anschutz stablemates the Munich Barons, and only a 1-0 loss to eventual champions Zurich Lions denied them further glory. Their silver medal was considered a major success for a British side.

Bensons and Hedges Cup
The Knights performed well in the Bensons and Hedges Cup, making two semifinals and one final in three seasons.

Challenge Cup

The Knights also took part in the Challenge Cup, making three semifinals in five seasons.

All-time roster 

The majority of Knights players were Canadian-born; only a handful were British natives. Rich Bronilla is the most-capped Knights player with 125 appearances, and fellow Canadian Ian McIntyre was London's top scorer, with 25 goals. The following is a list of players who played for the Knights.

References 

 
Ice hockey clubs established in 1998
Ice hockey clubs disestablished in 2003
Ice hockey teams in London
Defunct ice hockey teams in the United Kingdom
1998 establishments in England
Sport in the London Borough of Tower Hamlets
Sports clubs established in 1998
Sports clubs disestablished in 2003
Millwall
Ice Hockey Superleague